Emile Broussard (born 5 February 1895, date of death unknown) was a French racing cyclist. He rode in the 1924 Tour de France.

References

1895 births
Year of death missing
French male cyclists
Place of birth missing